The 2022 elections for the Illinois House of Representatives occurred on Tuesday, November 8, 2022, to elect representatives from all 118 Representative districts in the Illinois House of Representatives. The primary election occurred on Tuesday, June 28, 2022. The winners of this election will serve in the 103rd General Assembly, with seats apportioned among the state based on the 2020 United States census. The Democratic Party has held a House majority since 1997. The inauguration of the 103rd General Assembly occurred on Wednesday, January 11, 2023.

The elections for Illinois United States Senator (Class III), Illinois's 17 congressional districts, Illinois Governor and Lieutenant Governor, Illinois Executive positions, and the Illinois Senate were held on this date.

The Republican Party needed to flip control of 15 seats to earn a majority in the Illinois House, but Democrats ended up picking up 5 seats.

Retirements

Democrats
District 4: Delia Ramirez retired to run for US Representative from Illinois's 3rd congressional district.
District 13: Greg Harris retired.
District 46: Deb Conroy retired to run for Chair of the DuPage County Board.
District 62: Sam Yingling retired to run for state senator from District 31.
District 72: Michael Halpin retired to run for state senator from District 36.

Republicans
District 45: Seth Lewis retired to run for state senator from District 24.
District 54: Tom Morrison retired.
District 88: Keith P. Sommer retired.
District 89: Andrew Chesney retired to run for state senator from District 45.
District 90: Tom Demmer retired to run for treasurer of Illinois.
District 95: Avery Bourne retired to run for lieutenant governor of Illinois.
District 97: Mark Batinick retired.
District 99: Sandy Hamilton retired to run for state senator from District 48.
District 105: Dan Brady retired to run for Secretary of State of Illinois.

Predictions

Overview

Close races

Election details

Redistricting

District index

Districts 1–25

District 1
The district has been represented by Democrat Aaron Ortiz since January 9, 2019. Ortiz was re-elected unopposed in 2020. He faced no ballot-listed candidate in the general election.

District 2
The district had been represented by Democrat Theresa Mah since January 11, 2017. Mah was re-elected unopposed in 2020. Mah was redistricted to the 24th Representative district and ran for re-election in her new district. Democratic state Representative Elizabeth Hernandez was redistricted from the 24th Representative district and was the Democratic nominee. Hernandez faced no other ballot-listed candidates in the general election.

District 3
The 3rd district covers parts of the Chicago neighborhoods of Belmont Cragin, Dunning, Hermosa, Logan Square, Montclare, Portage Park, and West Town. The district has been represented by Democrat Eva-Dina Delgado since her appointment on November 15, 2019. Delgado was elected unopposed in 2020. Jonathan Serrano, a United States Army veteran, was the Republican nominee.

District 4
The 4th district covers parts of the Chicago neighborhoods of Austin, Belmont Cragin, Hermosa, Humboldt Park, and West Town. The district had been represented by Democrat Delia Ramirez since January 9, 2019. Ramirez was re-elected unopposed in 2020. Ramirez ran in the 3rd congressional district and won. Lilian Jiménez, an attorney, Manuel Jimenez, Jr., and Hector Villafuerte all ran for the Democratic nomination. Jimenez won the Democratic nomination. JD Sloat was the Republican nominee.

District 5
The district has been represented by Democrat Lamont Robinson since January 9, 2019. Robinson was re-elected unopposed in 2020. Robinson faced no other ballot-listed candidate in the general election.

District 6
The district has been represented by Democrat Sonya Harper since her appointment in October 2015. Harper was re-elected unopposed in 2020. Harper defeated Carolynn Crump for the Democratic nomination. Leonard Griffin, a retiree and truck driver, was the Republican nominee.

District 7
The district has been represented by Democratic House Speaker Emanuel "Chris" Welch since January 9, 2013. Welch was re-elected unopposed in 2020. Eddie Kornegay, the CEO of a local tech startup, was the Republican nominee.

District 8
The district has been represented by Democrat La Shawn Ford since January 10, 2007. Ford was re-elected unopposed in 2020. Thomas Hurley, a member of Lions Club International, was the Republican nominee.

District 9
The district has been represented by Democrat Lakesia Collins since her appointment on July 24, 2020. Collins was elected unopposed in 2020. Collins faced no other ballot-listed candidate in the general election.

District 10
The district has been represented by Democrat Jawaharial Williams since his appointment on May 17, 2019. Williams was elected unopposed in 2020. Williams faced no other ballot-listed candidates in the general election.

District 11
The district has been represented by Democrat Ann Williams since January 12, 2011. Williams was re-elected unopposed in 2020. Marc James, an employee in hotel management, was the Republican nominee.

District 12
The district has been represented by Democrat Margaret Croke since January 2, 2021. Croke was first elected unopposed in 2020. Croke defeated Abigail Nichols for the Democratic nomination. George Kemper, an Army veteran, was the Republican nominee.

District 13
The district has been represented by Democrat Greg Harris since December 2006. Harris was re-elected unopposed in 2020. He is not seeking re-election. Five candidates ran for the Democratic nomination:

Eileen Dordek, a mental health professional
Hoan Huynh, an entrepreneur
Fernando "Sergio" Mojica, a Chicago Public School principal
Andrew Peters
Joe Struck
One additional candidate, Becky Levin (policy director at the Cook County Sheriff's Office), ran for the office but dropped out before the primary election. Hoan Huynh won the Democratic nomination.

Alper Turan, a teacher, was the Republican nominee.

District 14
The district has been represented by Democrat Kelly Cassidy since her appointment in May 2011. Cassidy was re-elected unopposed in 2020. She faced no other ballot-listed candidates in the general election.

District 15
The district had been represented by Democrat John D'Amico since November 2004. D'Amico was re-elected unopposed in 2020. On November 5, 2021, D'Amico announced he was retiring from his seat effective the same day. Michael Kelly, an athletic director, was appointed on November 23, 2021. Kelly defeated Michael Rabbitt, a business transformation leader at Argonne National Laboratory, for the Democratic nomination. Mark Albers, the Board President of the Morton Grove Chamber of Commerce, was the Republican nominee.

District 16
The district has been represented by Democrat Denyse Wang Stoneback since January 13, 2021. Stoneback was first elected unopposed in 2020. Stoneback lost the Democratic nomination to Kevin Olickal, a former Cook County recovery specialist. Vince Romano, a financial advisor and Republican candidate in 2012, was the Republican nominee.

District 17
The district has been represented by Democrat Jennifer Gong-Gershowitz since January 9, 2019. Gong-Gershowitz was re-elected with 67.6% of the vote in 2020. Bradley Martin was the Republican nominee.

District 18
The district has been represented by Democrat Robyn Gabel since her appointment in April 2010. Gabel was re-elected with 72.3% of the vote in 2020. Charles Hutchinson, president of the Wilmette-Kenilworth Chamber of Commerce, was the Republican nominee.

District 19
The district had been represented by Democrat Lindsey LaPointe since her appointment on July 24, 2019. LaPointe was elected with 58.4% of the vote in 2020. LaPointe defeated Tina Wallace, a real estate broker, for the Democratic nomination. Michael Harn was the Republican nominee.

District 20
The district has been represented by Republican Bradley Stephens since his appointment in June 2019. Stephens was elected with 54.6% of the vote in 2020. Stephens faced no other ballot-listed candidates in the general election.

District 21
The district had been represented by Democrat Edgar Gonzalez, Jr. since his appointment on January 10, 2020. Gonzalez was elected unopposed in 2020. Gonzalez was redistricted to the 23rd Representative district and ran for re-election in his new district. Democratic state Representative Michael J. Zalewski was redistricted from the 23rd Representative district and lost to Abdelnasser Rashid, former Deputy Chief of Staff for Cook County Clerk David Orr, for the Democratic nomination. Matthew Schultz, executive director of Taxpayers United of America, was the Republican nominee.

District 22
The district had been represented by Mike Madigan since January 13, 1993 and had served in the Illinois House since January 13, 1971. He was the 67th Speaker of the House from 1983 to 1995 and the 69th Speaker of the House from 1997 to 2021. Madigan was re-elected with 100.0% of the vote in 2020. After suspending his campaign for the Speakership in 2021, Madigan announced he would resign as state representative at the end of February but ended up resigning on February 18. Chicago City Council infrastructure manager Edward Guerra Kodatt was appointed to the district on February 21, 2021 but would resign three days later on February 24, 2021. He resigned due to Madigan and Chicago's 13th ward alderman Marty Quinn's suggestion after they became aware of “allegations of questionable conduct.” Angelica Guerrero-Cuellar, an auxiliary board member for the National Museum of Mexican Art, was appointed on February 25, 2021. Carlos Alvarez, an insurance agent, was the Republican nominee.

District 23
The district had been represented by Democrat Michael J. Zalewski since December 2008. Zalewski was re-elected unopposed in 2020. Zalewski was redistricted to the 21st Representative district and is running for re-election in his new district. Democratic state Representative Edgar Gonzalez, Jr. was redistricted from the 21st Representative district and was the Democratic nominee. Lupe Castillo was the Republican nominee.

District 24
The district had been represented by Democrat Elizabeth "Lisa" Hernandez since January 10, 2007. Hernandez was re-elected unopposed in 2020. Hernandez was redistricted to the 2nd Representative district and ran for re-election in her new district. Democratic state Representative Theresa Mah was redistricted from the 2nd Representative district and was the Democratic nominee. Mah faced no other ballot-listed candidates in the general election.

District 25
The district has been represented by Democrat Curtis Tarver since January 9, 2019. Tarver was re-elected unopposed in 2020. Tarver defeated Josef Michael Carr, a businessman, for the Democratic nomination. Lori Yokoyama was previously the Republican nominee but would drop out for unknown reasons. Tarver faced no other ballot-listed candidates in the general election.

Districts 26–50

District 26
The district has been represented by Democrat Kam Buckner since his appointment on January 18, 2019. Buckner was elected with 100.0% of the vote in 2020. She faced no other ballot-listed candidates in the general election.

District 27
The district has been represented by Democrat Justin Slaughter since his appointment in January 2017. Slaughter was re-elected unopposed in 2020. Slaughter defeated Jasimone Ward, an Emergency medical technician, for the Democratic nomination. Beth O'Neil was the Republican nominee.

District 28
The district has been represented by Democrat Robert Rita since January 8, 2003. Rita was re-elected with 99.4% of the vote in 2020. Rita defeated Paris Walker-Thomas, a write-in candidate, for the Democratic nomination. He faced no other ballot listed candidates in the general election.

District 29
The district has been represented by Democrat Thaddeus Jones since January 12, 2011. Jones was re-elected unopposed in 2020. Jones defeated Calumet City 2nd Ward Councilwoman Monet S. Wilson for the Democratic nomination. Jeffery Coleman, an entrepreneur, was the Republican nominee.

District 30
The district has been represented by Democrat Will Davis since January 8, 2003. Davis was re-elected unopposed in 2020. Patricia Bonk, a nurse, was the Republican nominee.

District 31
The district has been represented by Democrat Mary E. Flowers since January 9, 1985. Flowers was re-elected unopposed in 2020. Kenneth J. Yerkes, a dentist, was the Republican nominee.

District 32
The district had been represented by Democrat Andre Thapedi since January 14, 2009. Thapedi was re-elected unopposed in 2020. On January 31, 2021, Thapedi announced his intention to resign from his seat, stating the passing of his parents driving his intention. Thapedi resigned on March 17, 2021. City Colleges of Chicago associate athletics director Cyril Nichols was appointed to the seat on April 8, 2021 to fill the remainder of the term. Carl Kunz, a FINRA arbitrator, was the Republican nominee.

District 33
The district has been represented by Democrat Marcus C. Evans Jr. since his appointment in April 2012. Evans Jr. was re-elected unopposed in 2020. Quintin Barton was the Republican nominee.

District 34
The district has been represented by Democrat Nicholas Smith since his appointment on February 4, 2018. Smith was re-elected unopposed in 2020. Frederick Walls, a journeyman carpenter, was the Republican nominee.

District 35
The district has been represented by Democrat Frances Ann Hurley since January 9, 2013. Hurley was re-elected with 64.2% of the vote in 2020. Hurley defeated David Dewar, a write-in candidate, for the Democratic nomination. Herb Hebein, the Republican nominee in 2020, was the Republican nominee.

District 36
The district has been represented by Democrat Kelly M. Burke since January 12, 2011. Burke was re-elected unopposed in 2020. Robbie Katherine Regina and David Sheppard, a police officer, ran for the Republican nomination. Sheppard won the nomination.

District 37
The district had been represented by Republican Tim Ozinga since January 13, 2021. Ozinga was first elected with 63.7% of the vote in 2020. Ozinga defeated August "O'Neill" Deuser, the Republican nominee for Illinois's 1st congressional district in 2016, for the Republican nomination. He faced no other ballot-listed candidates in the general election.

District 38
The district has been represented by Democrat Debbie Meyers-Martin since January 9, 2019. Meyers-Martin was re-elected with 77.5% of the vote in 2020. Tom Toolis, an attorney, was the Republican nominee.

District 39
The district has been represented by Democrat Will Guzzardi since January 14, 2015. Guzzardi was re-elected unopposed in 2020. Anthony Curran, an investment manager, was the Republican nominee.

District 40
The district has been represented by Democrat Jaime Andrade Jr. since his appointment in August 2013. Andrade Jr. was re-elected unopposed in 2020. He faced no other ballot-listed candidates in the general election.

District 41
The district has been represented by Democrat Janet Yang Rohr since January 13, 2021. Rohr was first elected with 51.7% of the vote in 2020. Jennifer Bruzan Taylor, a Naperville City Councilwoman, was the Republican nominee. Taylor would drop out from the race due to family matters. Rich Janor, Naperville Park District Commissioner, was appointed as the Republican nominee.

District 42
The district had been represented by Republican Amy Grant since January 9, 2019. Grant was re-elected with 51.9% of the vote in 2020. Grant was redistricted to the 47th Representative district and is running for re-election in her new district. Democratic state Representative Terra Costa Howard was redistricted from the 48th Representative district and was the Democratic nominee. Stefanie Hood, a lawyer, was the Republican nominee.

District 43
The district has been represented by Democrat Anna Moeller since her appointment in March 2014. Moeller was re-elected unopposed in 2020. Angela Hallock Nowak, a teacher, was the Republican nominee.

District 44
The district has been represented by Democrat Fred Crespo since January 10, 2007. Crespo was re-elected with 100.0% of the vote in 2020. Patrick Thomas Brouillette, a business owner, was the Republican nominee.

District 45
The district had been represented by Republican Seth Lewis since January 13, 2021. Lewis was first elected in 53.2% of the vote in 2020. Lewis is running for the Illinois Senate in the 24th Legislative district. Republican state Representative Deanne Mazzochi was redistricted from the 47th Representative district and was the Republican nominee. Jenn Ladisch Douglass, a lawyer, was the Democratic nominee.

District 46
The district had been represented by Democrat Deb Conroy since January 9, 2013. Conroy was re-elected unopposed in 2020. Conroy is running for DuPage County Executive. Diane Blair-Sherlock, an attorney, was the Democratic nominee. Robert Stevens, a truck driver, was the Republican nominee.

District 47
The district had been represented by Republican Deanne Mazzochi since her appointment in July 2018. Mazzochi was re-elected with 54.0% of the vote in 2020. Mazzochi was redistricted to the 45th Representative district and is running for re-election in her new district. Republican state Representative Amy Grant was redistricted from the 42nd Representative district was the Republican nominee. Jackie Williamson, a benefits specialist, was the Democratic nominee.

District 48
The district had been represented by Democrat Terra Costa Howard since January 9, 2019. Howard was re-elected with 53.8% of the vote in 2020. Howard was redistricted to the 42nd Representative district and was re-elected in her new district. Azam Nizamuddin, an attorney, was the Democratic nominee. Jennifer Sanalitro, a sales executive, was the Republican nominee.

District 49
The district has been represented by Democrat Maura Hirschauer since January 13, 2021. Hirschauer was first elected with 54.2% of the vote in 2020. Bartlett mayor Kevin Wallace was the Republican nominee.

District 50
The district had been represented by Republican Keith R. Wheeler since January 14, 2015. Wheeler was re-elected with 56.4% of the vote in 2020. Wheeler was redistricted to the 83rd Representative district lost re-election in his new district. Democratic state Representative Barbara Hernandez was redistricted from the 83rd Representative district and was the Democratic nominee. Donald Walter, the director of diocesan partnerships at the Augustine Institute, was the Republican nominee.

Districts 51–75

District 51
The district had been represented by Republican Chris Bos since January 13, 2021. Bos was first elected with 50.9% of the vote in 2020. Nabeela Syed, an organizer, won the Democratic nomination after defeating Chelsea Laliberte Barnes, a licensed social worker, in the primary election.

Endorsements

District 52
The district has been represented by Republican Martin McLaughlin since January 13, 2021. McLaughlin was first elected with 54.3% of the vote in 2020. Mary Morgan, a curriculum assistant for Wauconda Community Unit School District 118, was the Democratic nominee.

District 53
The district has been represented by Democrat Mark L. Walker since January 9, 2019. He formerly represented the 66th district from January 14, 2009 to January 12, 2011. Walker was re-elected unopposed in 2020. Jack Vrett, an attorney, was the Republican nominee.

District 54
The district had been represented by Republican Tom Morrison since January 12, 2011. Morrison was not seeking reelection in 2022. Michele Hunter, an attorney, was the Republican nominee. Mary Beth Canty, an attorney, was the Democratic nominee.

District 55
The district has been represented by Democrat Marty Moylan since January 9, 2013. Moylan was re-elected with 72.6% of the vote in 2020. Michael M. Lupo, a small business owner, was the Republican nominee.

District 56
The district has been represented by Democrat Michelle Mussman since January 12, 2011. Mussman was re-elected with 57.6% of the vote in 2020. E. Dale Litney, a self-employed sports official, was the Republican nominee.

District 57
The district has been represented by Democrat Jonathan Carroll since his appointment on October 4, 2017. Carroll was re-elected unopposed in 2020. Rory Welch, a consultant, was the Republican nominee.

District 58
The district has been represented by Democrat Bob Morgan since January 9, 2019. Morgan was re-elected unopposed in 2020. Mike Clark, a construction manager, was the Republican nominee.

District 59
The district has been represented by Democrat Daniel Didech since January 9, 2019. Didech was re-elected unopposed in 2020.

District 60
The district has been represented by Democrat Rita Mayfield since her appointment in July 2010. Mayfield was re-elected unopposed in 2020.

District 61
The district has been represented by Democrat Joyce Mason since January 9, 2019. Mason was re-elected with 55.1% of the vote in 2020.

District 62
The district has been represented by Democrat Sam Yingling since January 9, 2013. Yingling was re-elected with 56.9% of the vote in 2020.

District 63
The district has been represented by Republican Steve Reick since January 11, 2017. Reick was re-elected with 54.8% of the vote in 2020.

District 64
The district has been represented by Republican Tom Weber since January 9, 2019. Weber was re-elected with 59.8% of the vote in 2020.

District 65
The district has been represented by Republican Dan Ugaste since January 9, 2019. Ugaste is seeking a third term. Democrats slated scientist and small business owner Linda Robertson for the district. Ugaste's campaign committee chair endorsed Robertson over Ugaste in the race.

District 66
The district has been represented by Democrat Suzanne Ness since January 13, 2021. Ness was first elected with 52.0% of the vote in 2020. Dundee Township Supervisor Arin Thrower and Connie Cain are seeking the Republican nomination.

District 67
The district has been represented by Democrat Maurice West since January 9, 2019. West was re-elected with 66.5% of the vote in 2020.

District 68
The district has been represented by Democrat Dave Vella since January 13, 2021. Vella was first elected with 50.2% of the vote in 2020, or by 239 votes.

District 69
The district has been represented by Republican Joe Sosnowski since January 12, 2011. Sosnowski was re-elected unopposed in 2020.

District 70
The district has been represented by Republican Jeff Keicher since his appointment on July 2, 2018. Keicher was re-elected with 57.7% of the vote in 2020.

District 71
The district has been represented by Republican Tony McCombie since January 11, 2017. McCombie was re-elected with 61.6% of the vote in 2020.

District 72
The district has been represented by Democrat Michael Halpin since January 10, 2017. Halpin was re-elected with 59.7% of the vote in 2020. He is retiring to run for state Senator.

District 73
The district has been represented by Republican Ryan Spain since January 11, 2017. Spain was re-elected unopposed in 2020.

District 74
The district has been represented by Republican Daniel Swanson since January 11, 2017. Swanson was re-elected with 71.0% of the vote in 2020.

District 75
The district has been represented by Republican David Welter since his appointment in July 2016. Welter was re-elected with 100.0% of the vote in 2020.

Districts 76–100

District 76
The district has been represented by Democrat Lance Yednock since January 9, 2019. Yednock was re-elected with 54.4% of the vote in 2020. Jason Haskell is challenging Yednock as a Republican.

District 77
The district has been represented by Democrat Kathleen Willis since January 9, 2013. Willis was re-elected with 67.2% of the vote in 2020. Willis is facing Norma Hernandez, a Triton College trustee, for the Democratic nomination.

District 78
The district has been represented by Democrat Camille Lilly since her appointment in April 2010. Lilly was re-elected with 83.3% of the vote in 2020.

District 79
The district had been represented by Republican Jackie Haas since December 8, 2020. Haas was first elected with 63.8% of the vote in 2020.

District 80
The district has been represented by Democrat Anthony DeLuca since his appointment in March 2009. DeLuca was re-elected with 79.8% of the vote in 2020.

District 81
The district has been represented by Democrat Anne Stava-Murray since January 9, 2019. Stava-Murray was re-elected with 52.6% of the vote in 2020. She is running for re-election in the 81st district, going against Republican candidate Paul Leong.

District 82
The district has been represented by Republican Leader Jim Durkin since his January 2006 appointment. Durkin was re-elected with 65.8% of the vote in 2020.

District 83
The district is currently represented by Democrat Barbara Hernandez, but she is seeking a third term in the 50th district. Republican Keith R. Wheeler, who has represented the 50th district since 2015, is running for re-election in the 83rd district. In the general election, he will face either Arad Boxenbaum or Matt Hanson, who are vying for the democratic nomination

Democratic primary 
Boxenbaum is an activist and a member of the Geneva Public Library Board and Hanson is a former Kane County Board member. If elected, Boxenbaum would be the youngest person ever to serve in the General Assembly.

According to his campaign filing, Hanson does not live in the 83rd district.

District 84 
The district has been represented by Democrat Stephanie Kifowit since January 9, 2013. Kifowit was re-elected unopposed in 2020.

District 85
The district has been represented by Democrat Dagmara Avelar since January 13, 2021. Avelar was first elected with 59.0% of the vote in 2020.

District 86
The district has been represented by Democrat Larry Walsh Jr. since his appointment in April 2012. Walsh Jr. was re-elected unopposed in 2020.

District 87
The district has been represented by Republican Tim Butler since his appointment in March 2015. Butler was re-elected with 84.5% of the vote in 2020.

District 88
The district has been represented by Republican Keith P. Sommer since January 13, 1999. Sommer was re-elected with 60.1% of the vote in 2020.

District 89
The district has been represented by Republican Andrew Chesney since December 5, 2018. Chesney is running for the Illinois State Senate. 71st district Representative Tony McCombie and Victoria Onorato are seeking the Republican nomination.

District 90
The district has been represented by Republican Tom Demmer since January 9, 2013. Demmer was re-elected with 67.3% of the vote in 2020. He is retiring to run for treasurer.
Former state representative John Cabello and labor union official and Roscoe Village president Mark Szula are running for the Republican nomination.

District 91
The district has been represented by Republican Mark Luft since January 13, 2021. Luft was moved into another district. Normal Town Councilman Scott Preston and James Fisher are running for the Republican nomination. McLean County Board member Sharon Chung and Karla Bailey-Preston are running as Democrats.

District 92
The district has been represented by Democrat Jehan Gordon-Booth since January 14, 2009. Gordon-Booth was re-elected with 74.5% of the vote in 2020. Benjamin Watt is running for the Republican nomination.

District 93
The district has been represented by Republican Norine Hammond since her appointment in December 2010. Hammond was re-elected with 65.9% of the vote in 2020. Pekin mayor and 91st district Representative Mark Luft and Caterpillar Inc. official Travis Weaver are seeking the Republican nomination.

District 94
The district has been represented by Republican Randy Frese since January 14, 2015. Frese was re-elected with 76.3% of the vote in 2020. Frese is running in a neighboring district. 93rd district Representative Norine Hammond is seeking the Republican nomination here.

District 95
The district has been represented by Republican Avery Bourne since her appointment in February 2015. Bourne was re-elected with 70.1% of the vote in 2020. Bourne is running for Illinois Lieutenant Governor. 87th district Representative Tim Butler and former Illinois state Trump campaign official Kent Gray are seeking the Republican nomination.

District 96
The district has been represented by Democrat Sue Scherer since January 9, 2013. Scherer was re-elected with 51.5% of the vote in 2020. Prescott Paulin, a Marine Corps veteran and tech innovator and Lisa Smith are both seeking the Republican nomination.

District 97
The district has been represented by Republican Mark Batinick since January 14, 2015. Batinick was re-elected with 52.0% of the vote in 2020. On November 3, 2021, Batinick announced he would not seek another term in office. Tom McCullagh, a small business owner and Republican nominee for the 49th Legislative district in the 2020 Illinois Senate election, and Michelle Smith, a small business owner and the Plainfield Township Clerk are running for the Republican nomination.
2020 Democratic nominee Harry Benton is running again.

District 98
The district has been represented by Democrat Natalie Manley since January 9, 2013. Manley was re-elected unopposed in 2020. Barry Haywood is challenging Manley in the Democratic primary.

District 99
The district has been represented by Republican Mike Murphy since January 9, 2019. Murphy resigned during his term and was replaced by Sandy Hamilton. Hamilton is running for Illinois State Senate. 94th district Representative Randy Frese is running for this seat.

District 100
The district has been represented by Republican C. D. Davidsmeyer since his appointment in December 2012. Davidsmeyer was re-elected with 75.1% of the vote in 2020. He is running for re-election.

Districts 101–118

District 101
The district has been represented by Republican Dan Caulkins since January 9, 2019. Caulkins was moved to another district during redistricting. 110th district Representative Chris Miller is running in this seat.

District 102
The district has been represented by Republican Brad Halbrook since January 11, 2017, previously serving the 110th district in the Illinois House of Representatives from April 2012 to January 14, 2015. Halbrook was moved to another district during redistricting. 109th district representative Adam Niemerg is running in this seat.

District 103
The district has been represented by Democrat Carol Ammons since January 14, 2015. Ammons was re-elected with 78.7% of the vote in 2020.

District 104
The district has been represented by Republican Michael Marron since his appointment on September 7, 2018. Marron was re-elected with 58.8% of the vote in 2020. 2020 Democratic nominee Cynthia Cunningham is again challenging Marron.

District 105
The district has been represented by Republican Dan Brady since January 9, 2013, who formerly represented the 88th district from January 10, 2001 to January 9, 2013. Brady was re-elected with 62.7% of the vote in 2020. Brady is retiring to run for Illinois Secretary of State. Kyle Ham, Dennis Tipsword, Mike Kirkton, and Don Rients are running for the Republican nomination.

District 106
The district has been represented by Republican Tom Bennett since January 14, 2015. Bennett was re-elected unopposed in 2020.

District 107
The district has been represented by Republican Blaine Wilhour since January 9, 2019. Wilhour was moved to another district during redistricting. 102nd district Representative Brad Halbrook is running in this seat.

District 108
The district has been represented by Republican Charles Meier since January 9, 2013. Meier was re-elected with 73.8% of the vote in 2020. Meier is running in a neighboring district. Former state representative Wayne Rosenthal is running for the Republican nomination. Wayne Rosenthal.

District 109
The district has been represented by Republican Adam Niemerg since January 13, 2021. Niemerg was re-elected with 82.2% of the vote in 2020. Niemerg is running in a neighboring district. 108th district Representative Charlie Meier is running in this seat.

District 110
The district has been represented by Republican Chris Miller since January 9, 2019. Miller was moved to another district during redistricting. 107th district Representative Blaine Wilhour is running for this seat.

District 111
The 111th district will be located in the Metro East and include all or parts of Alton, Bethalto, East Alton, Edwardsville, Glen Carbon, Godfrey, Granite City, Hartford, Madison, Maryville, Mitchell, Pontoon Beach, Rosewood Heights, Roxana, South Roxana, and Wood River. The district has been represented by Republican Amy Elik since January 13, 2021. Elik was first elected with 54.4% of the vote in 2020. Joe Silkwood, former mayor of East Alton, is running for the Democratic nomination.

District 112
The 112th district will be located in the Metro East and include parts of Caseyville, Collinsville, Edwardsville, Fairmont City, Fairview Heights, Glen Carbon, Granite City, Madison, Maryville, O'Fallon, Pontoon Beach, Roxana, Shiloh, and Swansea. The district has been represented by Democrat Katie Stuart since January 11, 2017. Stuart was re-elected with 53.7% of the vote in 2020. Illinois Republican Party Spokesman Joe Hackler and Jennifer Korte are seeking the GOP nomination.

District 113
Democrat Jay Hoffman, who has been a member of the Illinois House of Representatives since January 9, 1991 (with a nine-month interruption in 1997), has represented the district since January 9, 2013. Hoffman was re-elected with 75.1% of the vote in 2020. Businesswoman Ashley Hunsaker is seeking the Republican nomination.

District 114
The district has been represented by Democrat LaToya Greenwood since January 11, 2017. Greenwood was re-elected with 57.1% of the vote in 2020. St. Clair County Board member Kevin Dawson and local Chiropractor Kevin Schmidt are seeking the Republican nomination.

District 115
The district had been represented by Republican Paul Jacobs since January 13, 2021. Jacobs was moved into the 118th district during redistricting. 116th district Representative David Friess is running for the GOP nomination.

District 116
The district has been represented by Republican David Friess since January 13, 2021. Friess was moved into the new 115th district in redistricting. 117th district Representative Dave Severin and businessman Gary Carter are seeking the GOP nomination. Carter was removed from the ballot after a legal challenge.

District 117
The district has been represented by Republican Dave Severin since January 11, 2017. In redistricting, Severin was moved into the new 116th district. Current 118th Representative Patrick Windhorst and Ron Ellis are seeking the GOP nomination.

District 118
The district has been represented by Republican Patrick Windhorst since January 9, 2019. In redistricting, Windhorst was moved into the new 117th district. Current 115th district Representative Paul Jacobs and John A. Logan College Trustee Aaron Smith are seeking the GOP nomination. Jacobs won the Republican nomination in the June 28th primary.

External links
Find your district/elected officials  (Needs update for redistricting)
Illinois Online Voter Registration Application 
Polling Place Lookup

References

Illinois House of Representatives
2022
Illinois House